Mathewson is a surname. Notable people with the surname include:

Christy Mathewson (1880–1925), baseball player
Courtney Mathewson (born 1986), water polo player
Elisha Mathewson (1767–1853), US senator
George Mathewson (born 1940), Chairman of the Royal Bank of Scotland
Henry Mathewson (1886–1917), baseball pitcher
Katherine Mathewson, Canadian political candidate
Ron Mathewson (1944–2020), jazz musician

See also
Christy Mathewson–Memorial Stadium
Mathewson Farm
Matthewson

Patronymic surnames